The Odisha cricket team (known as Orissa until 2011) is a domestic cricket team based in the Indian state of Odisha. It is in the elite group of the Ranji Trophy.

Its main home ground is Barabati Stadium in Cuttack. Home matches are also played at DRIEMS Ground in Cuttack, East Coast Railway Stadium in Bhubaneswar, Veer Surendra Sai Stadium in Sambalpur, KIIT Cricket Stadium in Bhubaneswar and other grounds. The Odisha cricket team is selected by the Odisha Cricket Association (OCA). The OCA organises the Odisha Premier League every year to promote cricket and search for local talent throughout the state.

The team's recent best performance in the Ranji Trophy came in the 2016–17 season and 2019-20 season, when they advanced to the quarter-final stage. They lost there to the eventual champions Gujarat and Bengal respectively, under the captaincy of Govinda Poddar in 2016-17 and Subhranshu Senapati 2019-20.

History
Odisha first competed at first-class level in the 1949–50 Ranji Trophy, when they lost to Bihar by 356 runs. Their first victory came in 1952–53, when they defeated Assam by an innings. They played only against other East Zone teams (Bihar, Assam and Bengal) until 1983–84, when they progressed to the Ranji Trophy quarter-finals for the first time.

At the completion of the 2017–18 season, Odisha had played 296 Ranji Trophy matches. They had won 64, lost 106 and drawn 126.

Past and present players

Players from Odisha who have played International Cricket, along with year of debut:
Debashish Mohanty (1997)
Sanjay Raul (1998)
Shiv Sunder Das (2000)
Anshuman Rath (2014) (International caps for Hong Kong)   

Prominent players at the domestic level:
Rashmi Parida 
Pravanjan Mullick
Ranjib Biswal
Basant Mohanty
Biplab Samantray
Govinda Poddar
Natraj Behera

Squad
Players with international caps are listed in bold.

Updated as on 24 January 2023

Coaches
Coaches in Odisha cricket team are listed below:
 Debashish Mohanty
 Shiv Sunder Das
 Sanjay Raul
 Ranjib Biswal
 Sanjay Kumar Satapathy
 Subit Biswal
 Michael Bevan
 Balvinder Sandhu
 Sourajit Mohapatra
 Abakash Khatua
 Wasim Jaffer

Records
For more details on this topic, see List of Odisha first-class cricket records, List of Odisha List A cricket records, List of Odisha Twenty20 cricket records.

References

External links
 Odisha Cricket Association website
 Odisha at CricketArchive

Indian first-class cricket teams
Cricket in Odisha
1949 establishments in Orissa
Cricket clubs established in 1949